Belcher is an unincorporated community in Pike County, Kentucky. Belcher has a post office with ZIP code 41513.

Belcher has been noted for its unusual place name.

References

Unincorporated communities in Pike County, Kentucky
Unincorporated communities in Kentucky